Ricardo Conord was an Argentine architect and art director. He designed sets for more than eighty films throughout his career during the Golden Age of Argentine Cinema.

Selected filmography
 Buenos Aires Nights (1935)
 Mateo (1937)
 Three Argentines in Paris (1938)
 Honeymoon in Rio (1940)
 I Want to Be a Chorus Girl (1941)
 Valentina (1950)

 References 

 Bibliography 
 Finkielman, Jorge. The Film Industry in Argentina: An Illustrated Cultural History''. McFarland, 24 Dec 2003.

External links 
 

Year of birth unknown
1982 deaths
Argentine art directors